Anthony Mark Spencer (1955 – 28 April 1985) was an Australian outlaw biker noted for his role in the Milperra massacre of 1984.

"Throw-away kid"
Spencer was born into a broken home, and was not even certain if Anthony Mark Spencer was his birth name as he grew up in a series of foster homes in the Sydney area. He never knew his father while his mentally ill mother committed suicide. As a "throw-away kid" whom no-one ever really cared about, he was a sad, lonely child who desperately sought love and affection, which he never received. While he was "in care" at an Anglican boys home at the age of 11, he was seized by the other boys who forced his head into a full bathtub in an unsuccessful attempt to drown him. The incident left Spencer with an intense aquaphobia (fear of water). A barely literate boy, he took to writing out his feelings in a diary full of spelling mistakes, a habit that was to endure for the rest of his life. Spencer alternated between moments of intense depression where he would cry for hours and a stoic acceptance of his "fate to be a boy to be despised".

The Comancheros 
In an attempt to conquer his aquaphobia, Spencer joined the Royal Australian Navy at the age of 17. Spencer was so unused to affection that he was known to break into tears of joy when any of the other sailors showed him any kindness. During his brief career in the navy, Spencer took to heavy drinking and marihuana use, both of which proved to be lifelong habits. After his discharge from the navy at the age of 19, Spencer joined the Comanchero Motorcycle Club led by "Jock" Ross. He was so desperate to join the Comancheros that he lied about his military service, claiming to have served in the Australian Army and to have fought in the Vietnam war, claims that had no foundation in reality. Spencer came to see the Comancheros as a surrogate family and "Jock" Ross as his surrogate father who gave him the love that he had never received from the father he had never known. His biker name was "Snodgrass" or "Snoddy" for short. 

Spencer's relations with Ross started to decline when he was not invited to Ross's wedding. Ross's bride, Vanessa Eaves, had vetoed having Spencer at the wedding under the grounds that: "Snoddy is always stoned and you know how stupid he gets. I'm not going to have him ruin my wedding". Spencer formed a common-law relationship with his girlfriend, Lee Denholm. Having a stable relationship also weakened his loyalty to Ross as he no longer needed his approval to feel loved. In 1982, Ross broken the Comancheros into two chapters with one remaining under his leadership while Spencer became the president of the new Birchgrove chapter. By this point, Spencer was complaining that Ross – whom he had once revered – was treating him like a child in need of his strict supervision. 

In one of his first acts as a chapter president, Spencer visited the United States to buy parts for Harley-Davidson motorcycles, which were both difficult and expensive to obtain in Australia at the time. The trip to the United States was Spencer's first visit outside of Australia as he until then he lived his entire life in New South Wales and Queensland. In Albuquerque, New Mexico, Spencer met Ronnie Hodge, the president of the Bandidos Motorcycle Club whose headquarters are in Houston, Texas. When Hodge told him that he was willing to open a pipeline for selling both legitimate and stolen motorcycle parts in Australia, Spencer jumped at the chance and took him up on his offer. In return, Hodge wanted Spencer to export chemicals legal in Australia to the United States. At the time, P2P, one of the chemicals necessary for manufacture of amphetamines, were legal in Australia, but not in the United States. The Bandidos wanted an alliance to have P2P smuggled into the United States to assist with manufacturing amphetamines, the market for which they dominated in Texas. Hodge had once served in the United States Marine Corps, and was able to form a strong rapport with the former sailor Spencer, who admitted to him that he found Ross to be too overbearing. Upon his return to Australia, Spencer was already talking about joining the Bandidos.

The Bandidios
In November 1983, the Birchgrove Comanchero chapter under Spencer broke away to form the first Australian chapter of the Bandidos. Ross demanded the return of the former Comanchero "colours", a demand that was only partially met as a number of the Comanchero colours had been mailed off to Texas, which proved to be the source of much ill-will. Spencer appointed Colin "Caesar" Campbell to be his sergeant-at-arms. The Australian journalists Lindsay Simpson and Sandra Harvey wrote that Spencer seemed ill-suited for leadership as there was a "permeant feeling of uneasiness about him. He was their leader, he made the decisions, but leadership did not sit easily on his shoulders". Over the course of 1983 and 1984, relations between the Bandidos and the Comancheros grew increasingly tense. On 9 August 1984, three Comancheros were beaten up by the Bandidos at the Bull and Bush Hotel, which in turn led to a  biker war being declared on 11 August 1984. Over the rest of the month, there were a number of incidents involving shootings, though no deaths, between the two clubs.

The Milperra Massacre
On 2 September 1984 at the parking lot of the Viking Tavern in the Sydney suburb of Milperra, a swap meet was being hosted by the British Motorcycle Club of Sydney. During a swap meet, used and new motorcycle parts along with motorcycle-related memorabilia and trinkets were put on the market while barbecue food and alcohol were sold in plentiful quantities. Spencer had learned that Ross and the Comancheros were present at the swap meet waiting for him, and decided to confront him rather staying away, which he thought was cowardly. Spencer had called upon his men and armed themselves for the swap meet. Spencer who was determined to prove that he was a brave leader was full of machismo that day as he stated: "We'll go anywhere to show the other clubs we're not scared. If the Comancheros are there, we'll go ahead as planned. We'll show our colors and bash them".

The Comancheros led by Ross had been waiting to ambush the Bandidos, but let their guard down when Spencer and the rest were half a hour late to the Viking Tavern. As Spencer arrived at the Viking Tavern, he noticed the Comancheros were present with guns, but decided to continue to avoid looking like a coward. It remains unclear even today who fired the first shot, but it is clear that the shoot-out in the parking lot of the Viking Tavern began very shortly after the Bandidos arrived. During the clash in the parking lot of the Viking Tavern, the Comancheros and Bandidos fought each other with their fists, baseball bats and guns. Despite his machismo, Spencer stayed in his car during the shoot-out and only got out to assist with pulling away the wounded. By the time the police arrived, four Comancheros, two Bandidos and Leanne Walters, an innocent teenage girl caught in the crossfire, were all dead.

Suicide
In the aftermath of the massacre, Spencer was charged with first-degree murder. Spencer was charged with "constructive first-degree murder". The Crown alleged in its indictment of Spencer though he not killed anyone himself, his position as Bandidos national president; his decision to have his followers armed; and to go to the Viking Tavern knowing full well that violence was likely to occur made him just as guilty of murder as those who actually pulled the triggers. He was denied bail and held in jail. Spencer became increasingly depressed in jail and felt especially guilty over Walters's killing. On 28 April 1985, Spencer hanged himself in his cell at the Parklea Maximum Security Jail while facing charges of first-degree murder. His badly written suicide note read: "I, Tony Spencer, do not want my wife to have any part in my life or death. Lee Denholm is my lady and Joel is my son and they will get all my belongings. Lee, I am sorrry [sorry] for this, but remember I will always love you and my son. PPS, I want my bros to not think of me as weak, but as tired of fighting for the well being of my club. I have failed my club maybe I don't no [know]. But I do no [know] someone will do the right thing for the club". In the 2012 television mini-series Bikie Wars: Brothers in Arms, Spencer was played by Callan Mulvey.

Books

References

1955 births
1985 deaths
1985 suicides
20th-century Australian criminals
Australian male criminals
Australian organised crime figures
Criminals from New South Wales
Australian crime bosses
Royal Australian Navy personnel
People from Sydney
Deaths in police custody in Australia
Suicides by hanging in New South Wales
Organised crime in Sydney
Bandidos Motorcycle Club